The 1998–99 Biathlon World Cup was a multi-race tournament over a season of biathlon, organised by the International Biathlon Union. The season started on 11 December 1998 in Hochfilzen, Austria, and ended on 14 March 1999 in Holmenkollen, Norway. It was the 22nd season of the Biathlon World Cup.

Calendar
Below is the IBU World Cup calendar for the 1998–99 season.

World Cup Podium

Men

Women

Men's team

Women's team

Standings: Men

Overall 

Final standings after 23 races.

Individual 

Final standings after 3 races.

Sprint 

Final standings after 9 races.

Pursuit 

Final standings after 9 races.

Mass Start 

Final standings after 2 races.

Relay 

Final standings after 6 races.

Nation 

Final standings after 18 races.

Standings: Women

Overall 

Final standings after 23 races.

Individual 

Final standings after 3 races.

Sprint 

Final standings after 9 races.

Pursuit 

Final standings after 9 races.

Mass Start 

Final standings after 2 races.

Relay 

Final standings after 6 races.

Nation 

Final standings after 18 races.

Medal table

Achievements
Victory in this World Cup (all-time number of victories in parentheses)

Men
 , 6 (15) first places
 , 4 (5) first places
 , 3 (9) first places
 , 2 (8) first places
 , 1 (11) first place
 , 1 (4) first places
 , 1 (3) first place
 , 1 (3) first place
 , 1 (2) first place
 , 1 (2) first place
 , 1 (1) first place
 , 1 (1) first place
 , 1 (1) first place

Women
 , 8 (8) first places
 , 4 (18) first places
 , 4 (16) first places
 , 3 (3) first places
 , 2 (4) first places
 , 1 (4) first place
 , 1 (1) first place

Retirements
The following notable biathletes retired after the 1998–99 season:

References

External links
IBU official site

Biathlon World Cup
1998 in biathlon
1999 in biathlon